Saïda Keller-Messahli, born July 25, 1957 in Aouina near Bizerte in northern Tunisia, is a Swiss-Tunisian freelance journalist, writer and human rights activist. She is the founder and president of the Forum for a Progressive Islam and received the 2016 Swiss Prize for Human Rights.

Biography 
Saïda Keller-Messahli was born in 1957 in northern Tunisia. She is the fifth of eight children of a family of Berber origin working in agriculture. The Swiss association Terre des hommes placed her with a host family from 1964 to 1970 in Grindelwald (Bern) where she educated in the village school. Because her family was too poor to raise her, Saïda Keller-Messahli returned to Tunisia at the age of 13 following the divorce of the welcoming couple. She continued her studies and obtained her baccalaureate in Tunisia.

Political battles 
In 2004, Saïda Keller-Messahli founded the Forum for a Progressive Islam (of which she is still president), inspired by the book „The Illness of Islam“ by Abdelwahab Meddeb. She advocated the creation of a register and an authorization system for imams and a limitation of the number of mosques to 300 in Switzerland.

References

Swiss human rights activists
Swiss women journalists
Tunisian women
1957 births
Living people
Former Muslim critics of Islam